Huatan is a railway station on the Taiwan Railways Administration West Coast line located in Huatan Township, Changhua County, Taiwan.

History
The station was opened on 26 March 1905.

See also
 List of railway stations in Taiwan

References 

1905 establishments in Taiwan
Huatan Township
Railway stations in Changhua County
Railway stations opened in 1905
Railway stations served by Taiwan Railways Administration